This is a partial alphabetical list of all the songs known to have been recorded and/or performed by, or featuring Milva, between 1959 and 2012. Over 1200 of her songs are listed below, organised by language and listed in chronological order of recording, performance, and/or release.

All songs by Milva

Italian

A

B

C

D

E

F

G

I

J

L

M

N

O

P

Q

R

S

T

U

V

German

French

Spanish

Neapolitan

English

Japanese

Greek

"Sto perigiali" (live) (2000)
"Thalassa" (1994)
"Thalassa" (live) (1998) (limited release)

Korean

"Barley Field"

Latin

"Ave Maria"
"Ave Maria" (2000)
"Ave Maria" (live) (feat. Tangoseís) (2005)

Other

References

 Milva Official Website 
 Milva's complete international discography
 Milva at Last.fm
 Milva at Billboard.com

External links
 Milva Official website 
 Complete international discography for Milva
 Milva at Last.fm
 Milva at Billboard.com

Milva